Stemorrhages exaula is a moth of the family Crambidae. It is endemic to the Hawaiian islands of Kauai, Oahu, Molokai, Maui and Hawaii.

Adults are pale green.

The larvae feed on Ochrosia sandwicensis and Rauvolfia sandwicensis. The larvae feed in webbed-together, younger leaves of the host plant as well as pupate in the same place.

External links

Spilomelinae
Endemic moths of Hawaii
Moths described in 1888